Isolasia is a genus of moths of the family Noctuidae.

Species
 Isolasia biramata Warren, 1912

References
Natural History Museum Lepidoptera genus database
Isolasia at funet

Cuculliinae